Biston thibetaria is a moth of the family Geometridae. It is found in China (Henan, Zhejiang, Hubei, Hunan, Fujian, Guangxi, Sichuan, Guizhou, Yunnan, Tibet).

References

Moths described in 1886
Bistonini